Estigmene melanoxantha is a moth of the family Erebidae. It was described by Max Gaede in 1926. It is found in the Afrotropical realm.

References

 

Spilosomina
Moths described in 1926